USS Tacony is a name used more than once by the United States Navy, and may refer to:

 , a gunboat in commission from 1864 to 1867 which saw action during the American Civil War
 , a patrol vessel in commission from 1917 to 1918.

See also
 , a Confederate States Navy vessel in commission briefly during June 1863

United States Navy ship names